El diario de una señorita decente, was a Mexican telenovela produced by Ernesto Alonso for Telesistema Mexicano in 1969. Starring Carmen Montejo and Manuel Garay.

Cast 
 Carmen Montejo as Elena
 Manuel Garay as Román
 Eva Calvo as Virginia
 Socorro Avelar as Micaela
 Lorena Velázquez as Clotilde
 Jorge Vargas as Julio
 Yolanda Ciani as Beatriz
 César del Campo as Antonio
 Silvia Pasquel as Marie
 Tara Parra as Carla
 Oscar Morelli as Juan Manuel

References 

1969 telenovelas
Televisa telenovelas
Mexican telenovelas
1969 Mexican television series debuts
1969 Mexican television series endings
Spanish-language telenovelas